Probiy (also called, Yaremche) is a waterfall on the Prut River, in Yaremche City,  Ivano-Frankivsk Oblast, Ukraine.

History
The waterfall was significantly higher during the 19th century. The waterfall lost its height as the channel leading up to it  deepened. There have been fatalities from people falling into the water onto rocks near the waterfall. The Probiy waterfall is a popular local place for kayakers and rafters.

Gallery

See also
 Waterfalls of Ukraine

References

Waterfalls of Ukraine